William Orville Reeves (December 5, 1904 – December 6, 1983) was an American professional basketball player. He played for the Akron Firestone Non-Skids in the National Basketball League. He played college basketball at Canterbury College (then called Central Normal College) for four years. Reeves was inducted into the Indiana Basketball Hall of Fame.

References

1904 births
1983 deaths
Akron Firestone Non-Skids players
American men's basketball players
Basketball players from Indiana
Canterbury Knights basketball players
Guards (basketball)